Kłosowice may refer to:
 Kłosowice, Greater Poland Voivodeship
 Kłosowice, West Pomeranian Voivodeship